Dr. Denis Reidy is a former Limerick GAA Gaelic footballer.

Playing career

Gaelic Football
The Gerald Griffins GAA clubman represented Limerick GAA at Senior, Under 21 and Junior championship level, winning a McGrath Cup medal in 2001. He played for the University College Cork team that won the Cork Senior Football Championship and Munster Senior Club Football Championship in 1999. He also won a University and Colleges Division 1 All-Ireland SF League winners medal in 1996.

Hurling
Reidy also played hurling for Ballybrown Hurling club that won the Limerick Under-21 Hurling Championship in 1992 and also represented University of Limerick that won the University and Colleges Division 1 All-Ireland SH League in 1991.

Australian Rules Football
Reidy played full back for the Ireland national Australian rules football team, that won the 2001 Atlantic Alliance Cup and the 2002 Australian Football International Cup. He was one of Ireland's best on ground in the final against Papua New Guinea.

References 

Living people
Limerick inter-county Gaelic footballers
Gaelic footballers who switched code
Irish players of Australian rules football
Alumni of University College Cork
Sportspeople from Limerick (city)
People associated with the University of Limerick
UCC Gaelic footballers
Year of birth missing (living people)